Urbangarde (アーバンギャルド) is a Japanese band active since 2002. The formation is based in Tokyo and is currently composed of Hamasaki Yoko alias Yokotan (vocals), Matsunaga Temma alias Tenma (vocals), Okubo Kei (keyboards). The guitarist Zeze Shin alias Shinsama and the drummer Kagiyama Kyoichi alias Kyouchan left the band. Yachimura Kei alias Yashi (keyboard) was also part of the band in its earlier stages.

Urbangarde's music is characterized by its blend of electronic, pop, rock and various other musical styles. The mix of male and female vocals from Matsunaga Temma and Hamasaki Yoko often speak of social issues in Japan such as the high suicide rate, teen prostitution, teen pregnancy, death and disease. The name of the band is a mix of the word "urban" and part of the French expression "avant-garde" which means experimental or innovative.

Style and influences 

Urbangarde's musical styles vary from bubblegum pop to 80s style synthpop, punk, progressive rock, chiptune, new wave, goth, industrial and heavy metal. The members of the band sometimes define what they do as "Tokyo Virginity Pop" or "Trauma Techno Pop". The use of visual arts to support their music and ideas is a large part of their act, with performance art, otome (virginal) and Lolita fashion. They have also been known to sometimes read poetry in live shows. Tenma is responsible for the artistic aspects of the band and notably writes the lyrics, takes care of the general design of the band's image, promotional videos and music videos. Their numerous music videos often incorporate disturbing imagery such as blood, weapons, representations of suicide and a giant Kewpie doll that is often present in live performances as well. According to Matsunaga Temma, the doll represents a baby created by modern society. 

Red and white polka dots and sailor school uniforms are often used as an icon of Urbangarde. Temma said, "There’s a “shoujo (girl)” religion unique to Japan which has the sailor uniform and straight black hair as its icons, and you can’t separate those from sexuality and gender. In Japan’s case, it’s not only the demand from the male side, but also the female side has the desire to be young and to remain as a girl." It is cited on their official website that the band represents the "minority of underground cultures, virgins and otakus". For these reasons, their success grew heavily on the internet.

Hamasaki Yoko and Matsunaga Temma said in a PXLBBQ interview in France that Serge Gainsbourg is one of their influences. Technopop from the 80s is also a big inspiration for Matsunaga Temma.

History 
 
Urbangarde was created by lyricist, poet and man of the theatre Matsunaga Temma after meeting Hamasaki Yoko, who then sang old French songs. After seeing one of her performances, Matsunaga Temma recognized her talent and decided to make her the lead singer of the band. They started to significantly rise in popularity in 2007 after having passed the audition for Yahoo! Japan ・WHO’S NEXT and making it in the top 5 in over 3000 bands. After the release of the first three indie albums, their major debut singles "Skirt Kakumei" and "Tokimeki ni Shisu" were released under Universal Music Japan in 2011. The following album "Mental Hells" was their first major label album release. They then started performing for crowds of over 1000 in Tokyo and their 2012 album "Geiger Counter Culture" reached position number 10 on the daily Oricon chart in Japan and made the top 25 on its weekly chart. The album was a reflection on the post-Fukushima era in Japan. In an interview by Daniel Robson from noisy.vice.com, Tenma said; «[...] after the earthquake there has been a lot to get pissed off about in Japanese politics, and now we feel like we have a message to get across. » 
Urbangarde also participated in several seasons of the TV program Japan in Motion (NOLIFE TV), which eventually led them to perform live at the Toulouse Game Show in December 2012. Since then, the band has an ever-growing fanbase in France. The band also performed at Paris' anime mega-fest Japan Expo in July 2013  and then released their greatest hits compilation "Koi to Kakumei to URBANGARDE" featuring their new opus "Tokai no Alice".
Urbangarde's new album "Utsukushii Kuni" came out in June 2014. The title "Utsukushii Kuni" (Beautiful Country) is actually a play on words. Shinzo Abe, the Japanese prime minister, used the phrase as a title of his book and in a political speech during his first term. Urbangarde intentionally used the wrong Chinese character 鬱 (utsu=depression) instead of 美しい(utsukushii=beautiful). The album features artwork by Makoto Aida, a contemporary Japanese painter renowned for his provocative works of manga, painting, video, photography and sculpture.

Discography

Albums 
    Loss Of Virginity Production
    Shōjo wa nidoshinu (少女は二度死ぬ少女は二度死ぬ特装盤) (April 2008)
    Shōjo Toshi Keikaku (少女都市計画) (October 9, 2009)
    Shōjo no shōmei (少女の証明) (October 8, 2010)
    Mental Hells (メンタルへルズ) (October 26, 2011)
    Geiger Counter Culture (ガイガーカウンターカルチャー) (October 24, 2012)
    Koi to Kakumei to URBANGARDE (BEST OF COMPILATION) (恋と革命とアーバンギャルド) (June 19, 2013)
    Utsukushii Kuni (鬱くしい国) (June 18, 2014)
    SHOUWA 90 NEN (昭和九十年) (December 9, 2015)
    Tokyopop (January 1, 2020)
    Avantdemic (November 25, 2020)

Singles 

    Revisionist (修正主義者) (May 6, 2007)
    Girls War (傷だらけのマリア) (July 9, 2010)
    Skirt Kakumei (スカート革命) (July 20, 2011)
    Tokimeki ni Shisu (ときめきに死す) (September 28, 2011)
    Umare te mi tai (生まれてみたい) (March 7, 2012)
    Yameru Idol (病めるアイドル) (June 20, 2012)
    Sayonara Sub Culture (さよならサブカルチャー) (September 19, 2012)

References 

Japanese musical groups